This is a list of the mammal species recorded in the Faroe Islands. There are eleven mammal species in the Faroe Islands, of which two are endangered and two are vulnerable.

The following tags are used to highlight each species' conservation status as assessed by the International Union for Conservation of Nature:

Some species were assessed using an earlier set of criteria. Species assessed using this system have the following instead of near threatened and least concern categories:

Order: Cetacea (whales) 

The order Cetacea includes whales, dolphins and porpoises. They are the mammals most fully adapted to aquatic life with a spindle-shaped nearly hairless body, protected by a thick layer of blubber, and forelimbs and tail modified to provide propulsion underwater.

Suborder: Mysticeti
Family: Balaenidae
Genus: Eubalaena
 North Atlantic right whale, Eubalaena glacialis EN
Family: Balaenopteridae
Subfamily: Balaenopterinae
Genus: Balaenoptera
 Fin whale, Balaenoptera physalus EN
Suborder: Odontoceti
Superfamily: Platanistoidea
Family: Monodontidae
Genus: Delphinapterus
 Beluga, Delphinapterus leucas VU
Family: Phocoenidae
Genus: Phocoena
 Harbour porpoise, Phocoena phocoena VU
Family: Ziphidae
Subfamily: Hyperoodontinae
Genus: Hyperoodon
 Bottlenose whale, Hyperoodon ampullatus LR/cd
Family: Delphinidae (marine dolphins)
 Genus: Lagenorhynchus
 White-beaked dolphin, Lagenorhynchus albirostris LR/lc
 Atlantic white-sided dolphin, Lagenorhynchus acutus LR/lc
Genus: Orcinus
 Orca, Orcinus orca LR/cd
Genus: Globicephala
 Pilot whale, Globicephala melas LR/lc

Order: Lagomorpha (lagomorphs) 
Family: Leporidae (rabbits and hares)
Genus: Lepus
 Mountain hare, L. timidus  introduced

Order Rodentia (rodents)

Family Muridae (mice and rats)
Genus: Rattus
 Brown rat, Rattus norvegicus  introduced
Genus: Mus
 House mouse, Mus musculus  introduced

Order: Carnivora (carnivorans) 

There are over 260 species of carnivorans, the majority of which feed primarily on meat. They have a characteristic skull shape and dentition. 
Family: Phocidae (earless seals)
Genus: Halichoerus
 Grey seal, Halichoerus grypus LR/lc
Genus: Phoca
 Harbor seal, P. vitulina LC
Genus: Cystophora
 Hooded seal Cystophora cristata VU 
Genus: Pagophilus
 Harp seal, Pagophilus groenlandicus LC

Order: Chiroptera (bats) 
Bats have been increasingly recorded where they are thought to be either vagrants or artificially introduced. The bats' most distinguishing feature is that their forelimbs are developed as wings, making them the only mammals capable of flight. Bat species account for about 20% of all mammals.
Family: Vespertilionidae
Subfamily: Vespertilioninae
Genus: Eptesicus
 Northern bat, E. nilsonii  vagrant or introduced
 Serotine bat, E. serotinus  vagrant or introduced
Genus: Nyctalus
Lesser noctule, N. leisleri  vagrant or introduced
Genus: Pipistrellus
Nathusius' pipistrelle, P. nathusii  vagrant or introduced
Genus: Vespertilio
 Parti-coloured bat, V. murinus  vagrant or introduced

See also
List of chordate orders
Lists of mammals by region
List of prehistoric mammals
Mammal classification
List of mammals described in the 2000s

Notes

References
 

Mammals
Mammals
Faroe Islands
Faroe